In the Heart of the Young (also known as Winger II) is the second studio album by the American rock band Winger. It was released by Atlantic Records in 1990. Beau Hill produced the album. Although coming out at the decline of the glam metal scene in the U.S., the release was a commercial success, prompting additional touring by the group. It was the last album with guitarist/keyboardist Paul Taylor until 2023's Seven.

The album was certified platinum and produced such hits as "Can't Get Enuff", "Easy Come Easy Go" and "Miles Away", the latter reaching the Top 20 in the Billboard's single chart. According to Kip Winger, "Can't Get Enuff" and "Easy Come Easy Go" were late additions to the track listing, written because it was felt there were not enough rock songs on the album. The album itself peaked at #15 at the album chart.

Winger followed the release of the album with a 13-month world tour, playing with other heavy metal groups such as Kiss, Scorpions, Extreme, Slaughter, and with hard rock group ZZ Top.
A collection of music videos with the same title was released the following year in two separate VHS volumes.

Musically, In the Heart of the Young followed closely in the footsteps of the band's first album. The members, however, also made some notable changes in comparison to that, particularly given the new emphasis on both progressive rock elements and power ballads.

Album information
At least two more songs were recorded during the In the Heart of the Young sessions, but "All I Ever Wanted" and "Never" did not make it to the final album in America, because the producer Beau Hill found them too heavy for the Winger sound. Both were originally released as B-sides. "All I Ever Wanted" was later released as a bonus track on the Japanese pressings of the album, while "Never" was later released on Demo Anthology.

Track listing

Singles
"Can't Get Enuff" / "In the Day We'll Never See"
"Miles Away / "Rainbow in the Rose"
"Easy Come Easy Go" / "Battle Stations"

Personnel

Band members
 Kip Winger – vocals, bass, keyboards
 Reb Beach – guitars, vocals
 Rod Morgenstein – drums, percussion
 Paul Taylor – guitars, keyboards, vocals

Additional musicians
 Paul Winger – backing vocals
 Nate Winger – backing vocals
 Chris Botti – trumpet on "Rainbow in the Rose"
 Micheal Davis – trombone on "Rainbow in the Rose"

Album credits 
 Produced by Beau Hill
 Recorded by Jimmy Hoyson
 Mixed by Jimmy Hoyson and Beau Hill; assisted by Martin Horenburg
 Digital editing by Dave Collins
 Mastered at Sterling Sound, New York, by Ted Jensen
 Recorded and mixed at "The Enterprise", Burbank, California

Charts

Certifications

Video releases
The videos for "Can't Get Enuff" and "Miles Away" were made available on a 1990 VHS release entitled In the Heart of the Young, Vol. 1. It also includes "making of" segments and band interviews.

In 1991, In the Heart of the Young, Vol. 2 was released on VHS. It included promos for the videos of "Silent Night", "Easy Come Easy Go" and "You Are the Saint, I Am the Sinner", along with performance footage and band interviews. "Silent Night" was never recorded by the band for an album, and this VHS is the only official released version of the song.

References

1990 albums
Atlantic Records albums
Winger (band) albums
Albums produced by Beau Hill